Jerome is a ghost town in Gove County, Kansas, United States.

History
Jerome was issued a post office in 1886. The post office was discontinued in 1943.

References

Further reading

External links
 Gove County maps: Current, Historic, KDOT

Former populated places in Gove County, Kansas
Former populated places in Kansas